Mary Woronov (born December 8, 1943) is an American actress, writer, and figurative painter. She is primarily known as a "cult star" because of her work with Andy Warhol and her roles in Roger Corman's cult films. Woronov has appeared in over 80 movies and on stage at Lincoln Center and off-Broadway productions as well as numerous times in mainstream American TV series, such as Charlie's Angels and Knight Rider. She frequently co-starred with friend Paul Bartel; the pair appeared in 17 films together, often playing a married couple.

Early life
Woronov was born December 8, 1943 in the Breakers Hotel in Palm Beach, Florida, while it was temporarily operating as the Ream General Hospital during World War II. Woronov was born premature and doctors initially did not believe she would survive infancy. At a young age, she relocated with her mother to Brooklyn Heights in New York City, where her mother married Victor D. Woronov, a Jewish cancer surgeon in 1949; they settled as a family and her stepfather legally adopted her.  She has one younger half-brother, Victor, who was born on her eighth birthday. 

Woronov studied art and sculpting at Cornell University, where she met and befriended artist Gerard Malanga in 1963.

Acting career

1966–1973: Early work and collaborations with Andy Warhol
Through her friendship with Gerard Malanga, Woronov became involved with Andy Warhol's art studio, The Factory, in New York City. She appeared in numerous films for Warhol, becoming a Warhol superstar in the 1960s. She danced with Exploding Plastic Inevitable, Warhol's multimedia presentation of The Velvet Underground, and played Hanoi Hannah in Chelsea Girls, the 1966 experimental underground film directed by Warhol. The film was Warhol's first major commercial success after a long line of avant-garde art films (both feature-length and short). 

Of this time, she has said: "Of all the girls at Andy Warhol's Factory, I was the butch one. [Warhol] put me in his Screen Test and I spent my nights at Max's Kansas City. ... I was the strong girl at the Factory." Further reflecting on her working relationship with Warhol, she commented in 2018: "I have a very dark side, I can’t help it, but to me that period was wine and roses. It was darkness with pinpoints of light. My connection with Warhol was sort of like Lancelot’s connection to King Arthur".

Between 1970 and 1972, Woronov starred in several films by her then-husband, Theodore Gershuny: Kemek (1970) Sugar Cookies (1973); and the slasher film Silent Night, Bloody Night (1972).

Woronov's had a leading role in the Roger Corman-produced cult film Death Race 2000 (1975), followed by the Corman-produced Hollywood Boulevard (1976), directed by Alan Arkush and Joe Dante.

1979–1990: Relocation to Los Angeles; further film roles
Woronov relocated from New York to Los Angeles in 1979, appearing in Rock 'n' Roll High School the same year. Her breakthrough role came in Paul Bartel's black comedy Eating Raoul (1982), in which she portrayed the wife of a Los Angeles restaurant owner (also played by Bartel), both of whom resort to robbing and murdering swingers to support their declining business.

She subsequently had roles in numerous films including Blood Theatre (1984), Night of the Comet (1984), Chopping Mall and Nomads (1986). She became a fan of the Los Angeles punk music scene, and made an appearance with actor Jack Nance in the Suicidal Tendencies music video "Institutionalized" (1983); the two portrayed the protagonist's parents in the video. She later reprised this character in the band's music video for the song "Possessed To Skate" (1987).

Subsequent film roles include in Scenes from the Class Struggle in Beverly Hills (1989), Dick Tracy (1990), and Where Sleeping Dogs Lie (1991). On television, Woronov made guest appearances on numerous series in the 1980s, such as Logan's Run, Buck Rogers in the 25th Century, Charlie's Angels, Mr. Belvedere, Murder, She Wrote, Amazing Stories, St. Elsewhere, Wings, Babylon 5, Family Matters, and Highlander: The Series.

1991–present: Later film performances
In 1991, Woronov reprised her role from Rock 'n' Roll High School in the sequel Rock 'n' Roll High School Forever. In 1995, she had a supporting role in the independent comedy film Glory Daze. 

She later had roles in the animated Looney Tunes: Back in Action (2003), Rob Zombie's horror film The Devil's Rejects (2005), Ti West's supernatural horror film The House of the Devil (2009), and the black comedy splatter film All About Evil (2010).

She appeared in Barneys New York fall 2014 advertising campaign, "L.A. Stories," shot by Bruce Weber.

Other works

Painting and visual art
Woronov has worked as a painter since her relocation to California in 1979. She has cited painter Francis Bacon as an influence on her artwork.

In February 2022, she held a retrospective exhibition, The Story of the Red Shoe, at the Palm Springs Cultural Center.

Writing
In 1995, Woronov published the memoir Swimming Underground: My Years in the Warhol Factory, reflecting on her time as part of Andy Warhol's Factory. She published her first novel, Snake, in 2000. She subsequently published a short story collection in 2004 entitled Blind Love.

Personal life
Woronov married producer/director Theodore Gershuny in 1970, completing three films with himKemek (1970), Sugar Cookies (1973), and Silent Night, Bloody Night (1972)before their divorce in 1973. She then married producer Fred Whitehead in 1976, later divorcing. She has resided in Los Angeles, California since 1979.

Filmography

Notes

References

External links

 
 
 
 
 
 

Living people
20th-century American actresses
20th-century American memoirists
20th-century American novelists
20th-century American painters
20th-century American short story writers
20th-century American women writers
21st-century American actresses
Actresses from Florida
American adoptees
American film actresses
American painters
American television actresses
American women memoirists
American women novelists
American women painters
American women short story writers
Artists from Florida
Novelists from Florida
People associated with The Factory
People from Palm Beach, Florida
Year of birth missing (living people)